Echeta excavata is a moth of the family Erebidae. It was described by William Schaus in 1910. It is found in Costa Rica.

References

Phaegopterina
Moths described in 1910